Rock Creek (also, Keefers Station, after James L. Keefer, the first postmaster) is a former settlement in Butte County, California, United States. A post office operated in Rock Creek from 1858 to 1871. Rock Creek was an amalgamation of two smaller camps, Big Rock Creek and Little Rock Creek.

References

Former settlements in Butte County, California
Former populated places in California